Verona is a city in Dane County, Wisconsin, in the United States and is a suburb of Madison. The population was 14,030 at the 2020 census. The city is located ten miles southwest of downtown Madison within the Town of Verona. It is part of the Madison Metropolitan Statistical Area.

History

The town was named for Verona, New York. It was incorporated as a village in 1921 and as a city in 1978.

Verona used to be home to the Dane County Insane Asylum which opened in 1882, closed in 1973, and was demolished in 2006. It was previously a poor farm for people who needed care due to old age, blindness, disease, deformity, loss of limbs and insanity.

The area was also the site of a small leper colony sometime between 1890–1910. It is now a dog park.

Geography

Verona is located at  (42.989853, −89.535552).

Notable geographical features include the Verona Sugar River Valley, the Badger Mill Creek, and the Sugar River State Trail. A portion of the Ice Age National Scenic Trail also runs through Verona.

Climate and weather

On July 22, 2010, a tornado rated EF1 hit Verona.

On June 9, 2011, an EF1 tornado struck Verona, with winds peaking around 90 mph.

On the night of June 16, 2014 an EF3 tornado tore through Country View Elementary School and surrounding neighborhoods. No one was hurt by the tornado and the school was rebuilt and remodeled before school started in the fall.

On July 29, 2021 around 12:44 am an EF1 tornado with winds of 93 mph struck as well as a high-end EF0 tornado with winds of 85 mph at 12:47 am in Verona.

Demographics

2010 census
At the 2010 census there were 10,619 people, 4,223 households, and 2,845 families living in the city. The racial makeup of the city was 93.3% White, 1.3% African American, 0.3% Native American, 2.5% Asian, 0.7% from other races, and 1.9% from two or more races. Hispanic or Latino of any race were 2.4%.

Of the 4,223 households 39.4% had children under the age of 18 living with them, 54.4% were married couples living together, 9.6% had a female householder with no husband present, 3.3% had a male householder with no wife present, and 32.6% were non-families. 27.4% of households were one person and 9.4% were one person aged 65 or older. The average household size was 2.50 and the average family size was 3.09.

The median age was 37.4 years. 29% of residents were under the age of 18; 5.2% were between the ages of 18 and 24; 28.7% were from 25 to 44; 27.2% were from 45 to 64; and 9.8% were 65 or older. The gender makeup of the city was 48.4% male and 51.6% female.

2000 census
At the 2000 census there were 7,052 people, 2,591 households, and 1,873 families living in the city. The population density was 2,156.3 people per square mile (832.7/km). There were 2,664 housing units at an average density of 814.6 per square mile (314.5/km).  The racial makeup of the city was 97.46% White, 0.62% Black or African American, 0.17% Native American, 0.67% Asian, 0.23% from other races, and 0.85% from two or more races. 0.71% of the population were Hispanic or Latino of any race. Jewish population reaches 3 percent of total city population.
Of the 2,591 households 45.0% had children under the age of 18 living with them, 60.0% were married couples living together, 8.8% had a female householder with no husband present, and 27.7% were non-families. 21.6% of households were one person and 8.5% were one person aged 65 or older. The average household size was 2.68 and the average family size was 3.16.

The age distribution was 31.4% under the age of 18, 5.3% from 18 to 24, 31.3% from 25 to 44, 22.1% from 45 to 64, and 9.9% 65 or older. The median age was 36 years. For every 100 females, there were 93.7 males. For every 100 females age 18 and over, there were 89.3 males.

The median household income was $65,367 and the median family income  was $71,098. Males had a median income of $46,919 versus $32,296 for females. The per capita income for the city was $26,433. About 2.0% of families and 3.7% of the population were below the poverty line, including 2.9% of those under age 18 and 6.2% of those age 65 or over.

Verona Public Library

In 2006, Verona opened a new public library. The Prairie School-style facility has views of Badger Prairie Park. The land for the new building was negotiated as a trade with Dane County for the installation of water pipes in the park.

Education
The area is served by the Verona Area School District which includes the following schools:
 Verona Area High School
 Badger Ridge Middle School
 Savanna Oaks Middle School
 Verona Area Core Knowledge Charter School
 Country View Elementary School
 Glacier Edge Elementary School
 New Century Charter School
 Stoner Prairie Elementary School
 Sugar Creek Elementary School
 Verona Area International School

Business and industry
Epic Systems Corporation, a medical information systems company, is headquartered in Verona.

Attainment Company, a school curriculum and communications aid company for people with disabilities, is headquartered in Verona.

Notable people

William Charlton, Wisconsin legislator and farmer
Casey FitzRandolph, Olympic medalist in speed skating
Benjamin Heckendorn, video game console modder
Phil Kessel, NHL player (VGK)
Wayne Morse, U.S. Senator from Oregon
Ben Rortvedt, MLB player
Nick Schmaltz, NHL Player (ARI)
Jack Skille, NHL player
Derek Stanley, former NFL player
Aaron Stecker, former NFL player
Neil Walker, Olympic medalist in swimming
Henry F. Wilke, Wisconsin legislator and postmaster

References

External links
City of Verona

Cities in Wisconsin
Cities in Dane County, Wisconsin
Populated places established in 1921
1921 establishments in Wisconsin